Jose Miranda is an American retired soccer player who is an assistant coach with the Pima College women’s soccer team.

In 1989, Miranda joined the Tucson Amigos for the 1989–90 Southwest Independent Soccer League.  He earned Rookie of the Year honors with the Amigos. Miranda graduated from Sunnyside High School.  In 1990, Miranda entered Yavapai College where he was a member of the 1990 National Junior College Champions and 1991 National Junior College Runner-Up men’s soccer teams.  He then transferred to Sangamon State for the 1992 and 1993 seasons.  In 1993, Sangamon State won the NAIA national men's soccer championship.  In 1996, Miranda played for the New Mexico Chiles in the USISL Select League.  In 1997, he moved to the Arizona Sahuaros of the USISL D-3 Pro League.  He broke his leg during the season.  This led to his taking the boy’s head coaching position at Sunnyside High School.  He returned to playing in 2000 with the Tucson Fireballs.  In 2009, Miranda became an assistant coach of the women’s team at Pima Community College.

References

Living people
American soccer coaches
American soccer players
Arizona Sahuaros players
Tucson Amigos players
Tucson Fireballs players
New Mexico Chiles (USISL) players
USISL players
USISL Select League players
USL Second Division players
Association football forwards
Association football midfielders
Year of birth missing (living people)